Pieter Biesboer (born 1944), is a Dutch art historian and prolific writer on 17th-century Dutch art. His specialty is art from Haarlem.

Career 
Biesboer was a curator at Stedelijk Museum het Prinsenhof in Delft during the years 1973-1976. Biesboer became a curator of old masters at the Frans Hals Museum in Haarlem until he retired in 2009. Biesboer's publications include exhibition catalogs and research publications as well as important work for the Getty Research Institute on the Thieme-Becker catalog. After his retirement he began working on the Haarlem pages of the Getty Provenance Index.

Some Publications
 Frans Hals, by Seymour Slive, Pieter Biesboer and others, 1989, 
 Judith Leyster: a Dutch master and her world, by James A. Welu, Pieter Biesboer, Haarlem, Frans Hals Museum, Waanders, 1993
 'Topographical Identifications for a Number of "Haerlempjes" by Jacob van Ruisdael, in Shop Talk. Studies in Honor of Seymour Slive, Cambridge, Mass, 1995, 36-39
 De Vlamingen in Haarlem, Zwolle, Waanders, 1997
 Collections of paintings in Haarlem, 1572-1745, by P Biesboer; Carol Togneri, Los Angeles, Getty Provenance Index, Getty Research Institute, 2001
 Pieter Claesz: Master of Haarlem Still Life, by Pieter Biesboer and others, Zwolle, Waanders Publishers, 2004
 De Gouden Eeuw begint in Haarlem, by Pieter Biesboer, Haarlem, Frans Hals Museum & NAi, 2008
 Painting family : the De Brays : master painters of the 17th century Holland, by Pieter Biesboer, Zwolle, Waanders, 2008
  'De Laughing Cavalier van Frans Hals. Een mogelijke identificatie', in: Face Book. Studies on Dutch and Flemish Portraiture of the 16th-18th Centuries, The Hague 2013, p. 133-140
  'The Identification of a Family Portrait by Frans Hals Recently Acquired by The Toledo Museum of Art', The Burlington Magazine 155, nr. 1319 (2013): 72-76
  'De Haarlemse zilversmid Gerrit Pietersz Pauw (1605/06-1648)', in: De Stavelij Jaarboek 2014/15, p. 46-55
  'Barend Gast (ca. 1625-1679)meesterzilversmid in Delft en Leiden', in: De Stavelij Jaarboek 2016, p. 26-31.
  'Philips Lu(y)da (1634/35-1673, meesterzilversmid in Delft', in: De Stavelij Jaarboek 2016, p. 32-39
  'De Delftse zilversmid Nicolaes Adriaensz de Grebber (1544/45-1613)', in: De Stavelij Jaarboek 2018, p. 46-54
  'De Delftse zilversmid Adriaen Claesz de Grebber (1576/77-1658). Naamsverwarringen, nieuwe documenten en verbanden', in: De Stavelij Jaarboek 2018, p. 55-71
  'De identificatie van een familieportret door Frans Hals: nieuwe documenten', in Portretten van Frans Hals. Een familiereünie, cat. tent. Toledo, The Toledo Museum of Art; Brussel, KK Musea voor Schone Kunsten van België; Parijs, Fondation Custiodia, collectie Lugt, 2018-2019
 Delfts Zilver. Delftse goud- en zilversmeden en hun merken 1536-1807'', Zwolle 2020

References

Pieter Biesboer on codart

1944 births
Living people
Dutch art historians
Writers from Haarlem
Frans Hals Museum